Duchy of Friedland (Czech: Frýdlantské vévodství, German: Herzogtum Friedland) was a de facto sovereign duchy in Bohemia. It was created in 1627 and disappeared in 1634, after death of the ruler, Albrecht von Wallenstein (1582 - 1634). It was preceded by the Principality of Friedland (Czech: Frýdlantské knížectví, German: Fürstentum Friedland) existing in the years 1624 to 1627.

Establishment of the principality, and then the duchy, followed the rise to power of Albrecht von Wallenstein, a military leader in the service of the House of Habsburg during the Thirty Years' War.

In August 1622 Wallenstein was granted titles of Count Palatine (falckrabě, Pfalzgraf) and Imperial Count (hrabě, Graf). A predicate "of Friedland" (z Frýdlantu, von Friedland) was granted after northern Bohemian town Frýdlant (Friedland) acquired by Wallenstein in 1621, together with the whole Friedland dominion (panství, Herschaft). On 7 September 1623 he was given title of Imperial Duke. At this time he owned 49 dominions in eastern and northern part of Bohemia, in year 1624 the number grew up to 64 and on 12 March 1624 Emperor Ferdinand II declared the area as Principality of Friedland. Because of ducal title the Principality was elevated to Duchy on 4 January 1627.

The new duchy was de facto independent from the rest of Bohemia. Wallenstein had started an ambitious reconstruction of Jičín, capital of the duchy. He planned to set up bishopric, university and a diet. In 1628 he obtained the right to mint its own coins and the rights to grant nobility titles and township privileges.

Preparation for the new university included invitation of Jesuits to Jičín where they established a Jesuit college. Wallenstein initiated building of a large early-Baroque church as a seat of the bishop (the building was never finished though but serves until today as the main church in the town). Next to the church the ducal palace was built. Area of the town had doubled during this period. Near to Jičín a large park was established - remains of whose survived until now.

Throughout the duchy Wallenstein's financier Hans de Witte set up and controlled silver, copper and lead mines, iron forges, armament factories and river Labe transportation system, all geared up to supply warlord's forces.

After Wallenstein's death (1634) most of the duchy was given to Count Matthias Gallas and its independent status was annulled.

Literature 
English:
 Golo Mann: Wallenstein, his life narrated, 1976, Holt, Rinehart and Winston, .
Czech:
 Jan Morávek, Zdeněk Wirth: Waldštejnův Jičín (Waldstein's Jičín), Prague, 1946.
 Zdeněk Hojda: Albrecht Václav Eusebius z Valdštejna, mezníky života (Albrecht Wenceslas Eusebius of Waldstein - the milestones of his life), in: Mojmír Horyna et al.: Valdštejnský palác, 2002, .
German:
 Anton Ernstberger: Wallenstein als Volkswirt im Herzogtum Friedland (Wallenstein as an economist in the Duchy of Friedland), Reichenberg i.B. Kraus. 1929. VI, 148 S. : Kt.. Prager Studien aus dem Gebiete der Geschichtswissenschaft ; 19. (See list of literature for publications about Wallenstein in German.)

Former duchies of the Kingdom of Bohemia
States and territories established in 1627
1627 establishments in the Holy Roman Empire
1627 establishments in the Habsburg monarchy
17th century in Bohemia